K-10 is a  state highway in the U.S. state of Kansas. It was originally designated in 1929. It is mostly a controlled-access freeway, linking Lawrence to Lenexa. It provides an important toll-free alternate route to Interstate 70 (the Kansas Turnpike). Several scenes for the TV-movie The Day After were filmed on the highway at De Soto in 1982 portraying a mass exodus evacuating the Kansas City area on I-70.

Route description

The highway's western end begins as a two-lane highway (a super-two at I-70 exit 197, just west of Lawrence. It bypasses the city to the south, providing access to Clinton Lake, and also intersects with U.S. Route 59, beginning a four lane freeway after the interchange. K-10 continues to the northeast on the new South Lawrence Trafficway (completed 2016) before interchanging with 23rd Street (Old K-10). After exiting Lawrence eastbound, it passes through the city of Eudora, and then the cities of De Soto and Olathe, suburbs of Kansas City. It then terminates at an interchange with Interstate 435 and Interstate 35 in Lenexa. In Johnson County, the road is called the Governor John Anderson, Jr. Highway.

History
K-10 originally extended west of Lawrence to Herington, via Alta Vista, Alma, and Topeka. In 1956 the portion between Topeka and K-99 near Alma was designated as US-40 in preparation for upgrading this stretch to Interstate standards (for I-70). The segment between Alta Vista and Herington was redesignated as K-4 and K-10 was truncated eastward to Lawrence.

The process of upgrading K-10 to a freeway was begun in 1974. The first section completed was the section from De Soto to the junction with K-7, opening on November 8, 1976. The freeway was finally completed on December 18, 1984, when the stretch from K-7 to I-435 was completed. The old two-lane roadbed of K-10 was turned over to the counties to use as a secondary route. In Douglas County it became CR 442, although many of the locals, especially in Eudora, commonly refer to it as Old K-10.

The portion of K-10 between the Edgerton Road exit and the De Soto interchange at former K-285 (now Lexington Avenue) was used in the movie The Day After and, for the purposes of the film, was temporarily redesignated Interstate 70.

South Lawrence Trafficway

In the early 1970s traffic studies of K-10 determined a bypass around the west and south sides of Lawrence was necessary, and the Kansas Department of Transportation commenced due diligence on the bypass project.  The bypass on the west side of Lawrence was completed in November 1996. Prior to the opening of the trafficway, K-10 had ended at the junction of US-40 and US-59 in Lawrence. Completion of the eastern leg of the trafficway was delayed for nearly three decades by lawsuits from environmentalist groups and Haskell University, as the planned route took the highway through the Haskell-Baker Wetlands. In October 2012, the deadline for the plaintiffs of the lawsuits to seek a Supreme Court review of the case passed, and a mitigation plan for the wetlands was added to the trafficway plans. Construction began on November 12, 2013, and was anticipated to be completed by Fall 2016 before Thanksgiving.  The ribbon cutting ceremony for the trafficway was held on November 4, 2016, and in attendance were many local and state leaders including Governor Sam Brownback and Senator Pat Roberts. The trafficway officially opened to all traffic on November 9, 2016. In Spring 2020, KDOT announced it was evaluating three alternatives to reconstruct the interchange with K-10 and I-70, and to add a grade separated interchange to the K-10 / Wakarusa Drive intersection. The preferred alternative will be identified in the Fall of 2020. South Lawrence Trafficway Record of Decision Posted : KDOT and FHWA have approved and released the Final Supplemental Environmental Impact Statement (SEIS) and Record of Decision for the SLT Project.  The public may download and review copies of the document and appendices by clicking the button below.  The formal Notice of Availability (NOA) for the project documents was published in the Federal Register on April 1, 2022.

https://slt-ks.org/slt-final-seis-documents/

Future
Final design will begin immediately with construction anticipated to begin in 2024.
https://slt-ks.org/

Junction list

See also

 List of state highways in Kansas

References

External links

 K-10 at route56.com
 K-10 exit guide at OKRoads

010
U.S. Route 40
Transportation in Douglas County, Kansas
Transportation in Johnson County, Kansas